The Imam Al-Khoei Benevolent Foundation is an organization created by Abul-Qassim Khoei, a Grand Ayatollah who was considered by much of the Shia world as his time's premier leader of Shias across the world. It is an international religious charitable institution.

History
The Al-Khoei Foundation began relief work in parts of southern Iraq after the first Gulf War, delivering relief supplies in defiance of US-imposed sanctions.

The Guardian wrote:

On April 12, 2003, the Al-Khoei family revealed that they are determined to continue the work of their murdered Abdul Majid al-Khoei who was killed in Najaf.

References

External links
 New York branch of the Imam Al-Khoei Foundation
 Alkhoei.com (Arabic)

Shia Islamic websites
Shia organizations